Napoleon I, Emperor of the French, has become a worldwide cultural icon generally associated with tactical brilliance, ambition and political power. His distinctive features and costume have made him a very recognizable figure in popular culture.

He has been portrayed in many works of fiction, his depiction varying greatly with the author's perception of the historical character. On the one hand, Napoleon has become a worldwide cultural icon who symbolizes military genius and political power.
For example, in the 1927 film Napoleon, young general Bonaparte is portrayed as a heroic visionary. On the other hand, he has often been reduced to a stock character and has frequently been depicted as a short and "petty tyrant", sometimes comically so.

Literature, Theatre, and Film
Napoleon plays an indirect yet utterly important part in Alexandre Dumas' novel The Count of Monte Cristo. The novel starts in 1815 with Napoleon exiled on the island of Elba. Here we learn that he hands a letter to the protagonist Edmond Dantès to give to one of his chief (fictional) supporters in Paris - Noirtier De Villefort, the president of a Bonapartist club. Dantès is unaware that Villefort is an agent of the exiled Emperor and that the letter Napoleon handed him contained instructions and plans about Napoleon's planned return to Paris. Dantès' rivals include Mr. Danglars, his long-time unspoken rival and shipmate, who first reports Dantès to the authorities as a bonapartist, and Gérard De Villefort, the opportunistic son of Noirtier and staunch royalist, who, in order to protect his father from being outed as a bonapartist, burns the letter and uses it's former existence to frame Dantès and have him imprisoned in the Chateau d'If until his escape after 14 years and seeks vengeance upon those who wronged him.

Napoleon features prominently in the BBC Doctor Who Past Doctor Adventure World Game, in which the Second Doctor must avert a plot to change history so that Napoleon is victorious. In an alternate timeline created by the assassination of the Duke of Wellington prior to Waterloo, Napoleon is persuaded to march on to Russia after the victory of Waterloo, but he dies shortly afterwards, his empire having become so overextended that the various countries collapse back into the separate nations they were before, thus degenerating into a state of perpetual warfare. (This situation is made worse due to the intervention of the Doctor's old enemies the Players).

In 2013, Applied Mechanics produced Vainglorious, an epic, 26-actor immersive performance with Mary Tuomanen portraying Napoleon.

Depictions of Napoleon in literature include:
Stanley from A Streetcar Named Desire invokes the Napoleonic Code while speaking with Blanche.
The pig in Animal Farm who wrests control of Jones's farm from the other animals and becomes a tyrant is named Napoleon.
Julien Sorel from The Red and the Black by Stendhal has to hide a portrait of Napoleon.
Vengeance Is Mine (1899) by Andrew Balfour is a novel revolving around Napoleon's exploits during the Hundred Days and the Battle of Waterloo.
Moreton Hall's novel General George (1903) focuses on the Pichegru Conspiracy plot to assassinate Napoleon.
The Thunderer (1927) by L. Adams Beck (writing as "E. Barrington") is a historical novel revolving around the romance between Napoleon and Joséphine.
St Helena (1936) by R. C. Sherriff
So Great A Man (1937) by "David Pilgrim" (a pseudonym for John Palmer and Hilary Saint George Saunders) depicts Napoleon's life in the years 1808–1809.
In Thomas B. Costain's historical novel The Last Love (1963), a dying Napoleon, banished to St Helena, tells his story to his lone companion, a girl who acts as his English translator.
Napoleon is an important character in Leo Tolstoy's War and Peace, where considerable space is devoted to Tolstoy's interpretation of his historical role. He consequently also appears in the adaptations and films of this novel, listed in the following section.
Napoleon appears briefly in the first section of Victor Hugo's Les Misérables, and is extensively referenced in later sections.
Noel B. Gerson's novel Emperor's Ladies (1959) focuses on Napoleon's marriage to Marie Louise of Austria.
Bernard Cornwell's novel Sharpe's Devil features a meeting between Napoleon, and the fictional Richard Sharpe.
He is featured in the manga Eikou no Napoleon – Eroica, written by the manga artist Riyoko Ikeda.
C. S. Forester's Hornblower series of novels are mostly set during the Napoleonic Wars, in particular book 9 of the series, Commodore Hornblower focusing on the French invasion of Russia and the subsequent defence of Riga from the period of 1812 onwards, and book 10 Lord Hornblower dealing with events in France up to the defeat of Napoleon by Wellington at Waterloo.
Napoleon is a main character in Ruth McKenney's novel Mirage (1956), set during the Campaign of Egypt.
Napoleon is one of the two main characters in Simon Scarrow's The Revolution Quartet, which details Napoleon's life from his birth to his defeat at the Battle of Waterloo alongside that of Arthur Wellesley's.
In an Archie comic story featuring Jughead Jones, he is inadvertently transported by ambulance to a mental hospital. At first he protests, but relents upon hearing how well the patients are fed. When a nurse asks for his name, he replies "Napoleon Bonaparte." A later update changed this to him saying "You know who I am, Sonic! I am the genius, Dr. Robotnik!"
H. Beam Piper's short story He Walked Around the Horses features a parallel universe in which both the American Revolution and the French Revolution were suppressed. Consequently, Napoleon does not rise to power and the Napoleonic Wars never take place. In 1809, he is described by a British general named Sir Arthur Wellesley as being a Colonel of Artillery in the French Army and a brilliant tactician whose loyalty to the French monarchy has never been questioned.
The collection If, or History Rewritten assembles numerous alternate history essays written in the first four decades of the 20th century. Napoleon has varying roles in many of them.
Elvira Woodruff's Dear Napoleon, I Know You're Dead, But ... (Holiday House, 1992), illus. Noah and Jess Woodruff  is a novel about a boy who writes letters to Napoleon.
Harry Turtledove's Alternate Generals anthology series have at least two stories based on the idea of Napoleon emigrating during the Terror. In volume 1's "The Last Crusader" by Bill Fawcett, he joined the Church and became a Cardinal in Rome; by the early 1810s he is a spiritual leader of the Allies who seek to overthrow the French Republic. In volume 2's "Empire" by William Sanders, he formed an independent Empire based in Louisiana; with his lieutenants Andrew Jackson and Davy Crockett he fights a valiant but doomed war against the British, vaguely analogous to the War of 1812.
Napoleon is a character in Treason's Tide by Robert Wilton, published in February 2013 by Corvus, an imprint of Atlantic Books; it is set during the summer of 1805. This novel was originally issued in June 2011 as The Emperor's Gold.
In the alternate history novel Napoleon in America (2014) by Shannon Selin, Napoleon escapes from St. Helena and winds up in the United States in 1821.
In J.W. Clennett's alternate history graphic novel, The Diemenois, Napoleon fakes his death and flees to the town of Baudin, West Van Diemen, a fictional French colony on Van Diemen's Land.
"Jonathan Strange and Mr. Norrell" by Susanna Clarke takes place partially during the Napoleonic Wars, and features Jonathan Strange fighting in Spain, and also plaguing Napoleon with nightmares. Lord Wellington also plays a large part in this novel.
Javier Sierra's novel La Pirámide Inmortal deals with an apocryphal story about Napoleon spending a whole night in the Great Pyramid of Giza
 Mary "Jacky" Faber, in the Bloody Jack series of novels, meets Napoleon in My Bonny Light Horseman, having infiltrated Napoleon's armies as a British spy.
Napoleon appears as a minor character in the Grimm novel The Icy Touch.
 In The Queen's Fortune: A Novel of Desiree, Napoleon, and the Dynasty that Outlived the Empire (2020), by Allison Pataki, Napoleon plays a prominent role in the story of his first fiancée, Désirée Clary.
In Grandville (2009-2014) by Bryan Talbot, France won the Napoleonic Wars and invaded Britain, and the world is populated mostly by anthropomorphic animals. Britain eventually regained its independence after a long campaign of civil disobedience and anarchist bombings, the Bonaparte Dynasty ruled the empire until Emperor Napoleon XII was killed by Detective Inspector Archibald LeBrock of Scotland Yard when he discovered the Emperor was part of a conspiracy to reconquer Britain in order to steal its oil.

In film:

 The Furies: T.C. likens himself to Napoléon and keeps a bust of him in his office. 
 The Swan: Beatrix is mortified to find Napoléon's name on Nicolas's blackboard; he later proposes a toast to Napoléon.

Computer and video games
The campaigns of Napoleon have been depicted in the sixth installment of the Total War series, Napoleon: Total War. Players have a chance to follow Napoleon's Italian, Egyptian or Russian campaigns.
Napoleon is featured on Assassin's Creed Unity as a supporting character. He also appears as the main antagonist in its downloadable content mission, Dead Kings.
Napoleon is a frequently used leader representing the French civilization in the Civilization series.
Napoleon appears in Scribblenauts and its sequels as something the player can summon.
The first expansion pack to Europa Universalis III, Napoleon's Ambition, bears his name and expands the game to cover his whole reign.
The game Mount & Blade: Warband features an expansion pack called "Napoleonic Wars" where the player can compete online as a soldier from one of many countries involved in the Napoleonic Wars.
Napoleon appears in the mobile game Fate/Grand Order as an Archer-class servant.
Napoleon is a Real-time Strategy game that was released in 2001 for the Game Boy Advance.
Napoleon appears in the mobile visual novel game "Ikemen Vampire" by Cybird as one of the dateable characters.
Napoleon is featured in the 2018 Role-playing game The Council as a supporting character.

Culinary

Seattle-based food brokerage and import firm The Napoleon Company. 
Beef Napoleon
Bigarreau Napoleon cherry
Bonaparte's Ribs, an early 19th-century English lollipop
Eggplant Napoleon
Napoléons

Film, radio and television

Film
The Battle of Waterloo (1913), played by Ernest Batley
Napoléon (1927), played by Albert Dieudonné
Napoleon at Saint Helena (1929), played by Werner Krauss
The Count of Monte Cristo (1934), played by Paul Irving
It Happened One Night (1934): Ellie says to her father "I hope you're not comparing yourself to Napoleon. He was a strategist. Your idea of strategy is to use a lead pipe."
Invitation to the Waltz (1935), played by Esme Percy
Hearts Divided (1936), played by Claude Rains
A Royal Divorce (1938), played by Pierre Blanchar
Conquest (1938), played by Charles Boyer
The Fire Devil (1940), played by Erich Ponto
The Young Mr. Pitt (1942), played by Herbert Lom
Kutuzov (1943), played by Semyon Mezhinsky
Kolberg (1945), played by Charles Schauten
Napoleone (1951), played by Renato Rascel
Scaramouche (1952), played by Aram Katcher (uncredited)
Désirée (1954), played by Marlon Brando. Laurence Olivier was impressed by Brando's interpretation of Napoleon, praising on The Dick Cavett Show that, "[It], I think, was immeasurably the best ever Napoleon [...] I have ever seen. Simply marvelous, simply because of his own particular quality of being so easy, so easily bringing a sense of genius to a character who was a genius."
Napoleon (1955), played by Daniel Gélin and Raymond Pellegrin
Napoleon Bunny-Part (1956): Napoléon (voiced by Mel Blanc) matches wits with Bugs Bunny
War and Peace (1956), played by Herbert Lom
The Story of Mankind (1957), played by Dennis Hopper
Austerlitz (1960), played by Pierre Mondy
War and Peace (1968), played by Vladislav Strzhelchik
Waterloo (1970), played by Rod Steiger
Eagle in a Cage (1972), played by Kenneth Haigh
Love and Death (1975), played by James Tolkan
The Loves and Times of Scaramouche (1976), played by Aldo Maccione
Time Bandits (1981), played by Ian Holm
Adieu Bonaparte (1985), played by Patrice Chéreau
Napoleon and Josephine: A Love Story (1987), played by Armand Assante
Bill & Ted's Excellent Adventure (1989), played by Terry Camilleri
The Emperor's New Clothes (2001), played by Ian Holm
The Count of Monte Cristo (2002), played by Alex Norton
Monsieur N. (2003), played by Philippe Torreton
Napoleon and Me (2006), played by Daniel Auteuil
Napóleon (2007), played by Tom Burke
Night at the Museum: Battle of the Smithsonian (2009), played by Alain Chabat
Minions (2015): one of the Minions' former masters was Napoléon
Napoleon (2023), played by Joaquin Phoenix

Radio
 His Father's Sword (BBC Regional Programme, 1937), portrayed by Terence De Marney
 The Dynasts (three-part series) (BBC Home Service, 1943), portrayed by Malcolm Keen
 The Dynasts (six-part series) (BBC Third Programme, 1951), portrayed by Robert Harris
 The Adventures of the Scarlet Pimpernel: "The Vicomte De Villier is to be Executed" and "New Recruits are Needed by the League" (NBC, 1952–53), actor unknown at this time. He is also prominently mentioned in the episode "The Ghosts of Martin's Folly".
 Children's Hour: "The House of the Pelican" (six-part serial) (BBC Home Service, 1954), portrayed by Robert Harris
 England's Harrowing (two-part series) (BBC Third Programme, 1960), portrayed by Malcolm Keen
 Animal Grab: "La Foire d'Empoigne" (BBC Third Programme, 1962), portrayed by Malcolm Keen
 Napoleon in Love (BBC Radio 4, 1969), portrayed by Marius Goring
 Five Morning Comedies: "Keep Your Hands Off My War" (BBC Radio 4, 1970), portrayed by Clive Swift
 The Dynasts (seven-part series) (BBC Home Service, 1970), portrayed by Maurice Denham
 St. Helena (BBC Radio 4, 1972), portrayed by Lee Montague
 Midweek Theatre: "Eagle and Spider" (BBC Radio 4, 1973), portrayed by Cyril Shaps
 The Day of Destiny (BBC Radio 4, 1974), portrayed by Barry Foster
 Napoleon Aboard HMS Bellerophon (BBC Radio 4, 1975), portrayed by Cyril Shaps
 Vanity Fair (ten-part serial) (BBC Radio 4, 1978), portrayed by Harold Kasket
 The Man of Destiny (BBC Radio 4, 1981), portrayed by David Suchet
 Thirty-Minute Theatre: "Shaggy Sokolov" (BBC Radio 3, 1984), portrayed by Michael Graham Cox
 Betsy and Napoleon (BBC Radio 4, 2005), portrayed by Alex Jennings
 Napoleon Rising (BBC Radio 3, 2012), portrayed by Toby Jones
 Tsar - "Alexander I: Into the Woods" (BBC Radio 4, 2017), portrayed by Charlie Anson
 Billy Ruffian (BBC Radio 4, 2018), portrayed by Adrian Scarborough

Television
 Amoureuse Joséphine (France, 1974), played by Pierre Arditi
 Bewitched: "Samantha's French Pastry", Uncle Arthur tries to conjure up a French pastry, but instead conjures up Napoleon, played by Henry Gibson.
 Blackadder: Back & Forth (1999), played by Simon Russell Beale
 Clone High: Napoléon is a recurring character; Abe Lincoln claims he has a Napoleon complex.
 Dad's Army: "A Soldier's Farewell", a soldier (Arthur Lowe) dreams he is Napoléon at the Battle of Waterloo
 DC's Legends of Tomorrow: Season 5, Episode 5 "A Head of her Time" Napoléon is played by Kazz Leskard.
 Deadliest Warrior featured Napoleon in their third season, squaring up against the first American president George Washington. Washington was the victor.
 Fairly OddBaby: Jorgen Von Strangle proposes the name "Napoléon" for Poof The Baby
 How the Brigadier Won His Medals (1954), played by Booth Colman
 Histeria!: Napoléon is a recurring character who speaks like Hervé Villechaize.
 I Dream of Jeannie: "My Master, Napoleon's Buddy", Jeannie sends Tony back in time to advise Napoleon (played by Aram Katcher), who suspects Tony of being a spy and plans to execute him
Jack of All Trades: Napoléon is a recurring character, played by Verne Troyer.
 Joséphine ou la comédie des ambitions (France, 1979), played by Daniel Mesguich
 Napoléon (2000): 4-part documentary series narrated by David McCullough
 Napoléon et l'Europe (France, 1991), played by Jean-François Stévenin
 Napoléon: la Campagne de Russie (France, 2015), played by Marc Duret
 Napoléon (2002), played by Christian Clavier
 Napoléon & Joséphine: A Love Story (1987), played by Armand Assante
 Napoleon and Love (UK, 1974), played by Ian Holm
 Robot Chicken: "Napoléon Bonamite", character is a cross between Bonaparte and Napoleon Dynamite
 The Love Story of Napoleon (1953), played by James Mason
 Time Squad: "Napoléon the Conquered", Napoléon is forced to take care of the house after Joséphine takes up fine arts
 War and Peace (UK, 1972), played by David Swift
 War and Peace (France/Italy, 2007), played by Scali Delpeyrat
 Horrible Histories (UK, 2009 - 2015), played by Jim Howick
 War and Peace (UK, 2016), played by Mathieu Kassovitz
 Yu-Gi-Oh! GX: Jéan-Louis Bonaparte is based on the cliché of Napoléon.

See also: Napoléon Bonaparte (Character) on IMDb

Places

Geography
 Many Avenues, Boulevards, Bridges, Monuments, and Streets in Europe are named for Napoleon.
Bonaparte, Iowa
Fort Napoléon, les Saintes
Napoleon, Indiana
Napoleon, Michigan
Napoleon, Missouri
Napoleon, Ohio
Napoleonville, Louisiana
Route Napoléon

Hospitality
 Hôtel Napoléon
 Napoleon House, opened by Nicholas Girod as a plot to provide refuge for the exiled Napoleon.
 Restaurants throughout the world are named for Napoleon.

Military
 Fort Napoléon des Saintes
 Fort Napoleon, Ostend
 French battleship Napoléon
 Napoléon-class ship of the line
 Operation Napoleon/Saline

Music
 During the Napoleonic Wars, a nursery rhyme warned children that Bonaparte ravenously ate naughty people.
Napoleon was the topic of many Sea Shanties following his death, most notably the song Boney was a Warrior
Ludwig van Beethoven had originally conceived of dedicating his Third Symphony to Consul Napoleon Bonaparte. Beethoven admired the ideals of the French Revolution, and Napoleon as their embodiment. According to Beethoven's pupil, F. Ries, when Napoleon proclaimed himself Emperor in May 1804, Beethoven became disgusted and went to the table where the completed score lay. He took hold of the title-page and tore it up in rage.
The Ani DiFranco song "Napoleon" satirizes the desire to continuously "conquer"; more specifically musicians who sign with big labels, thus employing "an army of suits" in order to "make a killing" rather than just "make a living".
The Bob Dylan song "On the Road Again" from his 1965 album Bringing It All Back Home references Napoleon: "Your mama she's hidin' inside the icebox/Your daddy walks in wearin' a Napoleon Bonaparte mask".
Another Bob Dylan song, "Like a Rolling Stone", from his seminal album Highway 61 Revisited references Napoleon: "You used to be so amused/At Napoleon in rags and the language that he used"
The Kinks song "Powerman" from their 1970 album Lola Versus Powerman and the Moneygoround, Part One references Napoleon: "People tried to conquer the world; Napoleon and Genghis Khan, Hitler tried and Mussolini too".
The Bee Gees song "Walking Back to Waterloo" from their 1971 album Trafalgar references Napoleon: "I wish there was another year, another time/When people sang and poems rhymed/My name could be Napoleon".
Swedish Pop group ABBA won the Eurovision Song Contest 1974 with the song "Waterloo", which uses the battle as a metaphor for a person surrendering to love similar to how Napoleon surrendered at Waterloo.
The Al Stewart song "The Palace of Versailles", from his 1978 album Time Passages, is filled with references and allusions to the French Revolution. One line specifically references Napoleon: "Bonaparte is coming/With his army from the south".
The Charlie Sexton song "Impressed" references Napoléon and Josephine (from Pictures for Pleasure)
The Mark Knopfler song "Done with Bonaparte" from his 1996 album Golden Heart is sung from the viewpoint of a soldier in Napoléon's army. The song recalls the soldier's many battles serving in Napoleon's Grande Armée.
The Tori Amos song "Josephine" from her 1999 album To Venus and Back is sung from the viewpoint of Napoléon during his unsuccessful invasion of Russia.
Iced Earth released the song "Waterloo" on their album The Glorious Burden, which details Napoleon's defeat at the Battle Of Waterloo.
Bright Eyes recorded a song called "Napoleon's Hat" for Lagniappe, an album released by Saddle Creek Records to raise funds for the Red Cross' Hurricane Katrina relief efforts.
The song "Viva la Vida" by Coldplay is loosely based on Napoleon's reign.
An episode of Epic Rap Battles of History is a rap battle between Napoleon Bonaparte and Napoleon Dynamite.
Bonaparte is the stage name of German-Swiss singer/producer Tobias Jundt.

Other
Automotive: Bugatti Royale Coupé Napoléon
Ornithology: Bonaparte's parakeet
Toys: Napoleonic toys

Recurring themes and stereotypes in popular culture

Napoleon's height

British propaganda of the time depicted Napoleon as of smaller than average height and the image of him as a small man persists in modern Britain. Some historians believe that the reason for the mistake about his size at death came from use of an obsolete French yardstick. Napoleon was a champion of the metric system (introduced in France in 1799) and had no use for the old yardsticks.

Napoleon's nickname of le petit caporal has added to the confusion, as some non-Francophones have mistakenly interpreted petit by its literal meaning of "small". In fact, it is an affectionate term reflecting on his camaraderie with ordinary soldiers.  Napoleon also surrounded himself with the soldiers of his elite guard, required to be 1.83 m (6 ft) or taller, making him look smaller in comparison.

Napoleon's name has been lent to the Napoleon complex, a colloquial term describing an alleged type of inferiority complex which is said to affect some people who are physically short. The term is used more generally to describe people who are driven by a perceived handicap to overcompensate in other aspects of their lives.

The Napoleon Delusion
Napoleon Bonaparte is one of the most famous individuals in the Western world. As delusional patients sometimes believe themselves to be an important or grandiose figure (see delusion), a patient claiming to be Napoleon has been a common stereotype in popular culture for delusions of this nature.

In the 1922 film Mixed Nuts, Stan Laurel plays a book salesman whose only volume for sale is a biography of Napoleon. When the character receives a blow to the head, he comes to believe that he is Napoleon and is subsequently admitted to a mental institution.

This cliché has itself been parodied:

In the Bugs Bunny film Napoleon Bunny-Part, the actual Napoleon is dragged away by psychiatric attendants, who believe he is delusional.
The song They're Coming to Take Me Away, Ha-Haaa! was recorded by Jerry Samuels billed as Napoleon XIV. Some other versions of the song were made with lyrics referencing the Napoleon delusion (such as a Spanish version entitled "Soy Napoleon") or with the artist's name referencing a fictitious emperor. 
In The Emperor's New Clothes, Ian Holm plays Napoleon who stumbles into the grounds of an asylum and finds himself surrounded by other "Napoleons" - he cannot reveal his identity for fear of being grouped with the deluded. Holm also played a less-than-serious Napoleon in the 1981 film Time Bandits.
The Discworld novel Making Money features a character who believes himself to be Lord Vetinari, imitating Vetinari's mannerisms and entertaining delusions of grandeur. It is later revealed that the local hospital has an entire ward for people with the same delusion, where they engage in competitions to determine who is the "real" Vetinari.
In an episode of cult 1960s British TV sci-fi show The Prisoner called "The Girl Who Was Death", which unusually for the series was a light-hearted comedy tale parodying the spy thriller genre, the villain Dr. Schnipps (Kenneth Griffith) believed that he was Napoleon and acted accordingly, at one point asking the protagonist Number Six (Patrick McGoohan), "You're not the Duke of Wellington, are you?"
In the first episode of season 2 of Teenage Mutant Ninja Turtles titled "Return of the Shredder" (1988), Scientist and Inventor, Baxter Stockman is seen in a jail cell with a man in Napoleonic garb spouting off dialogue in a French accent.
In an episode of Night Court, Judge Harry Stone (Harry Anderson) is placed in a jail cell along with a number of 'mentally disturbed' inmates all dressed as Napoleon. His court defense attorney (played by Markie Post) sees him and exclaims "Oh sir. They put you in with the little generals".
The award-winning video game Psychonauts features a mental patient, Fred Bonaparte, locked in an obsessive mind-game with his distant ancestor Napoleon, who is fighting for his mind.
In the Futurama episode "Insane in the Mainframe", Bender pretends to be a banjo playing Napoleon in order to stay in a robot asylum.

See also
 Napoleon legacy and memory

Notes

References